Widowville is an unincorporated community in Ashland County, in the U.S. state of Ohio.

History
A post office was established at Widowville in 1890, and remained in operation until 1903. According to tradition, Widowville was so named on account of there being many Civil War widows who lived there.

References

Unincorporated communities in Ashland County, Ohio
1880 establishments in Ohio
Populated places established in 1880
Unincorporated communities in Ohio